Roźwienica  (Rozhvenytsia) is a village in Jarosław County, Subcarpathian Voivodeship, in south-eastern Poland. It is the seat of the gmina (administrative district) called Gmina Roźwienica.

The village has a population of 720.

References

Villages in Jarosław County